Sylviane Berthod (born 25 April 1977 in Salins) is a female alpine skier from Switzerland, who was Swiss champion in downhill skiing (1997, 1998, 1999) and Giant Slalom (1998). At the 2002 Winter Olympics, she finished 7th in downhill.

External links
 

1977 births
Swiss female alpine skiers
Alpine skiers at the 2002 Winter Olympics
Alpine skiers at the 2006 Winter Olympics
Living people
Olympic alpine skiers of Switzerland
21st-century Swiss women